The 2007–08 I liga (then known as the II liga) was the 60th season of the I liga, the second highest division in the Polish football league system since its establishment in 1949. The league was operated by the Polish Football Association (PZPN). The league contested by 18 teams who competed for promotion to the 2008–09 Ekstraklasa. The regular season was played in a round-robin tournament. Each team played a total of 34 matches, half at home and half away. The season began on 28 July 2007, and concluded on 24 May 2008.

Teams
The following teams competed in the I liga 2007–08:

9 teams staying in the I liga:
Kmita Zabierzów
Lechia Gdańsk
ŁKS Łomża
Odra Opole
Piast Gliwice
Podbeskidzie Bielsko-Biała
Polonia Warszawa
Stal Stalowa Wola
Śląsk Wrocław

7 teams advancing from the II liga:
4 group champions:
GKS Jastrzębie
Motor Lublin
Tur Turek
Znicz Pruszków
3 advancing by way of the play-offs:
GKS Katowice
Pelikan Łowicz
Warta Poznań

2 teams relegated from the Ekstraklasa:
Placement in the relegation zone:
Wisła Płock
Involvement in corruption scandal:
Arka Gdynia

League standings

Results

Top goalscorers

Notes

References

2007–08 in Polish football
Pol
I liga seasons